Paraterschellingia is a genus of nematodes belonging to the family Cyartonematidae.

The species of this genus are found in Antarctica.

Species:

Paraterschellingia brevicaudata 
Paraterschellingia fusiformis 
Paraterschellingia fusuformis

References

Nematodes